WQDE-LD, virtual channel 33 (UHF digital channel 31), is a low-powered Novelisima-affiliated television station licensed to and serving Indianapolis, Indiana, United States; it started its existence licensed to Lafayette, though its signal range has never reached that market, and later moved its community of license to Wolcott. The station is owned by HC2 Holdings, and transmits from the northwest side tower farm in Indianapolis.

WQDE-LD has been silent since 2021 for construction upgrades.

History 
The station's construction permit was initially issued on February 22, 2011 under the calls of W33DE-D. The current WQDE-LD calls were assigned on February 8, 2017.

Digital channel

Former affiliations
33.1 - Infomercials
33.1 - Novelisima
33.2 - Decades

References

External links
DTV America

Low-power television stations in the United States
Innovate Corp.
QDE-LD
Television channels and stations established in 2020
2020 establishments in Indiana